The 1971 French Open was a tennis tournament that took place on the outdoor clay courts at the Stade Roland Garros in Paris, France. The tournament ran from 24 May until 6 June. It was the 75th staging of the French Open, and the second Grand Slam tennis event of 1971. Jan Kodeš and Evonne Goolagong won the singles titles.

Finals

Men's singles

 Jan Kodeš defeated  Ilie Năstase, 8–6, 6–2, 2–6, 7–5
• It was Kodeš' 2nd career Grand Slam singles title and his 2nd (consecutive) title at the French Open.

Women's singles

 Evonne Goolagong defeated  Helen Gourlay, 6–3, 7–5
• It was Goolagong's first career Grand Slam singles title.

Men's doubles

 Arthur Ashe /  Marty Riessen defeated  Tom Gorman /   Stan Smith, 6–8, 4–6, 6–3, 6–4, 11–9
• It was Ashe's 1st career Grand Slam doubles title and his 1st and only title at the French Open.
• It was Riessen's 1st career Grand Slam doubles title and his 1st and only title at the French Open.

Women's doubles

 Gail Sherriff Chanfreau /  Françoise Dürr defeated  Helen Gourlay /  Kerry Harris,  6–4, 6–1
• It was Chanfreau's third career Grand Slam doubles title, her second during the Open Era and her third title at the French Open.
• It was Dürr's sixth career Grand Slam doubles title, her fifth during the Open Era and her fifth (consecutive) and last title at the French Open.

Mixed doubles

 Françoise Dürr /  Jean-Claude Barclay defeated  Winnie Shaw /  Toomas Leius, 6–2, 6–4
• It was Dürr's 2nd career Grand Slam mixed doubles title and her 2nd title at the French Open.
• It was Barclay's 2nd career Grand Slam mixed doubles title and his 2nd title at the French Open.

References

External links
 French Open Official website

 
1971 Grand Prix (tennis)
1971 in French tennis
1971 in Paris